John Ole Moe (born 25 April 1963) is a retired Norwegian football goalkeeper.

He started his youth career in Drøbak-Frogn IL and represented Norway as a youth international. Ahead of the 1980 season he joined Moss FK, and already in 1981 he went on to a second-choice spot in Vålerenga IF. Ahead of the 1983 season he signed for Hamarkameratene, but as the clubs never agreed on the prize, the prize was set by a Football Association tribunal. Hamarkameratene refused to pay this prize as well, and Moe re-signed for Vålerenga just as the season started. In 1984 he joined Strømsgodset IF, played university soccer at Boston University, and rejoined Drøbak-Frogn in 1986.

From 1988 to 1990 he played for SFK Lyn. He then retired, and only played one post-retirement match, in the 1993 Eliteserien.

References

1963 births
Living people
People from Frogn
Norwegian footballers
Drøbak-Frogn IL players
Moss FK players
Vålerenga Fotball players
Strømsgodset Toppfotball players
Boston University Terriers men's soccer players
Lyn Fotball players
Eliteserien players
Norwegian First Division players
Association football goalkeepers
Norway youth international footballers
Norwegian expatriate footballers
Expatriate soccer players in the United States
Norwegian expatriate sportspeople in the United States
Sportspeople from Viken (county)